JAFC may refer to:
 Sherwood JAFC
 Jacksonville Armada FC
 Journal of Agricultural and Food Chemistry